The Men's omnium was held on 19 and 20 October 2013. 20 riders participated.

Results

Flying lap
First event results:

Points race
Second event results:

Elimination race
Third event results:

Individual pursuit
Fourth event results:

Scratch race
Fifth event results:

Time trial
Sixth event results:

Overall results
Final standings were as follows:

References

Men's omnium
European Track Championships – Men's omnium